The Filmfare Best Female Playback Award is given by the Filmfare magazine as part of its annual Filmfare Awards South for Malayalam films. The first Malayalam award was given in 2007. Before that, since 1997 till 2005, a common award for playback was available for both Male and Female singers of all the four South Indian languages.

Superlatives

Winners
The following is a list of the award winners and the film and song for which they won.

Nominations
The nominees were announced publicly only from 2009. The list along with winners:

2000s 
2009: K. S. Chithra – "Oduvil Oru" – Thirakkatha
 Aparna Rajeev – "Manju Thara" – Mizhikal Sakshi
 Gayatri – "Kannin Vathil" – Mulla
 Manjari – "Kadaloram Vatsa" – Minnaminnikoottam
 Rimy Tomy – "Aarumugham" – Mulla

2010s 
2010: K. S. Chithra – "Kunnathe Konna" – Pazhassi Raja
 Shreya Ghoshal – "Chanthu Thottille" – Banaras
 Shweta Mohan – "Thottal Pookkum" – Moz & Cat
 Shweta Mohan – "Priyanu Mathram" – Robin Hood
 Sujatha Mohan – "Muthe Muthe" – Kana Kanmani

2011: Shreya Ghoshal – "Kizhakku Pookkum" – Anwar
 K. S. Chithra – "Malakha Pole" – Mummy & Me
 Shreya Ghoshal – "Manju Mazhakkattil" – Aagathan
 Shweta Mohan – "Maavin Chuvatile" – Oru Naal Varum
 Sujatha Mohan – "Pachila Charthan" – Karayilekku Oru Kadal Dooram

2012: Shreya Ghoshal – "Paattil Ee Paattil" – Pranayam
Gayatri – "Ninviral Thumbil" – Beautiful
Jyotsna – "Chantham Thikanjoru" – Mohabbath
Manjari – "Chimmi Chimmi" – Urumi
Shreya Ghoshal – "Kaanamullal" – Salt N' Pepper

2013: Shweta Mohan – "Shyama Hare" – Arike
 K. S. Chithra – "Vishukkani Poothu" – Ivan Megharoopan
 Mamta Mohandas – "Iravil Viriyum" – Arike
 Remya Nambeesan – "Andelonde" – Ivan Megharoopan
 Shreya Ghoshal – "Nilave Nilave" – Chattakaari

2014: Vaikom Vijayalakshmi – "Ottakku Padunna" – Nadan
 Anuradha Sriram – "Vadakkini Poomughathu" – Ayal Njanalla
 Mridula Warrier – "Laalee Laalee" – Kalimannu
 Shreya Ghoshal – "Shalabhamayi" – Kalimannu
 Sithara – "Ennundodee" – Celluloid

2015: Shreya Ghoshal – "Vijanathayil" – How Old Are You?
 B. Arundhathi – "Maara Sannibho"  – Swapaanam
 Shweta Mohan – "Onaam Kombath" – Ottamandaram
 Sujatha Mohan – "Elampoo Vazhi" – Ottamandaram
 Vani Jayaram – "Olenjil Kuruvi" – 1983

2016: Shreya Ghoshal  – "Kaathirunnu" – Ennu Ninte Moideen
 Chitra Arun – "Oru Makara Nilavayi" – Rani Padmi
 Shreya Ghoshal – "Mele Mele" – Life of Josutty
 Shweta Mohan – "Kayampoo Niramayi" – Su Su Sudhi Vathmeekam
 Vaikom Vijayalakshmi – "Kaikkottum" – Oru Vadakkan Selfie

2017: Chinmayi – "Oonjalil Aadi" – Action Hero Biju
 Divya S. Menon – "Varthinkale" – Kali
 Rinu Razak – "Raavu Mayave" – Vettah
 Shweta Mohan – "Oruvela" – White
 Varsha Vinu – "Melle Vannupoyi" – Marupadi

2018: K. S. Chithra – "Nadavathil Thurannilla" – Kambhoji
 Gayathri Varma – "Kasavu Njorium" – Udaharanam Sujatha
 Shreya Ghoshal – "Akale Oru Kaadinte" – Ramante Edanthottam
 Shweta Mohan – "Orupuzhayarikil" – Munthiri Vallikal Thalirkkumbol
 Sithara Krishnakumar – "Vanamakalunnu" – Vimaanam

2019: Anne Amie – "Aararo" – Koode
 Megha Josekutty – "Endhe Kanna" – Aravindante Athidhikal
 Neha Nair –  "Ponnumkasavitta" – Queen
 Shreya Ghoshal – "Palthira" – Captain
 Shreya Ghoshal – "Maanam Thudukkanu" – Odiyan

See also

 List of music awards honoring women

References

External links

Female Playback
Music awards honoring women